Paul Horvat was a Hungarian and Croatian nobleman and the 28th bishop of Zagreb.

Paul was the brother of Ladislaus and John Horvat, and the nephew of John of Palisna. Paul, who succeeded Cardinal Demeter in 1379, was trusted by King Louis I of Hungary. The king died in 1382, while the bishop was on pilgrimage in Jerusalem. His elder surviving daughter, Queen Mary, was crowned his successor. Horváti joined the opposition to the underage Queen Mary and her mother, Louis' widow Elizabeth of Bosnia, who ruled in her name as regent. He invited King Charles III of Naples, Louis' closest agnate, to come to Hungary and claim the crown. Charles succeeded in assuming the Hungarian crown in late 1386, but Queen Elizabeth soon had him murdered.

After Charles' death, John and Ladislaus, along with other revolting nobles from Croatia, were granted shelter in Zagreb by Paul. Paul pawned church estates in order to collect money for an army against Elizabeth.

In 1386, the bishop's brothers and uncle captured the queens in Gorjani and imprisoned them. Elizabeth was strangled on the orders of the bishop's uncle, while Mary was eventually released by her husband, Sigismund of Luxembourg, who had recently been crowned king of Hungary. King Tvrtko I of Bosnia, Elizabeth's first cousin, was an ally of the Horvats, and made them governors of Usora. However, in 1394, after Tvrtko's death, John Horvat was captured and executed on the orders of Queen Mary and King Sigismund. What happened to Paul is unknown; he may have been executed together with his brother in August 1394, but he may have also fled to Apulia and served as counselor to Charles' son and successor, King Ladislaus of Naples.

References

Sources

|-

Paul
Medieval Croatian nobility
14th-century Croatian people
14th-century Hungarian people
14th-century Roman Catholic bishops in Croatia
Bishops of Csanád
Bishops of Zagreb
14th-century Roman Catholic bishops in Hungary
14th-century Croatian nobility